School colors (also known as university colors or college colors) are the colors chosen by a school as part of its brand identity, used on building signage, web pages, branded apparel, and the uniforms of sports teams. They can promote connection to the school – or 'school spirit' – and help differentiate it from other institutions.

Background

The tradition of school colors appears to have started in England in the 1830s. The University of Cambridge chose Cambridge blue for the Boat Race against the University of Oxford in 1836, Westminster School have used pink as their color since a boat race against Eton School in 1837, and Durham University adopted palatinate purple for its MA hood some time before that degree was first awarded in 1838.

Many US colleges adopted school colors between 1890 and 1910. These were generally chosen to be distinctive, something that grew harder as more colors and color combinations were taken, although many Presbyterian colleges chose to imitate Princeton University's black and orange. Some American schools, in a display of patriotism, adopted the national colors of "red, white, or blue."

The most popular colors among US colleges ranked in the 2012 Forbes Top 50 or in the 2013–13 NCAA basketball or cross-country rankings were white, blue, red, black, and gold. These same five colors were the most popular five colors among colleges in each of the three rankings individually.

Sports

The use of colors to identify university sports teams dates back at least to the second Boat Race between Oxford and Cambridge in 1836. While most universities use the same color(s) for their sports and other university branding, Cambridge Blue is only one of twelve colors in the supporting palette for the university, not one of their six core colors. The University of Nottingham uses green and gold for its sports, but the rest of the university uses blue as its brand color. Roger Williams University changed its athletics colors in 2018 to match the university colors, in order to "foster a strong, unified visual identity for RWU Athletics that is more cohesive with the overall University", stating that "this combination will be powerful in strengthening RWU's brand identity and awareness".

Most competitive teams keep two sets of uniforms, with one emphasizing the primary color and the other emphasizing the secondary color.  In some sports, such as American football, the primary color is emphasized on home uniforms, while uniforms for other sports, notably basketball, use the secondary or a neutral color at home, most commonly white.  This is done to avoid confusing the two schools' colors.

In addition, various groups that generate support for athletic teams, including cheerleaders and marching bands, wear uniforms with the colors of their school. At many private schools, or more traditional state schools, "school colors" are awards presented for achievement in a subject or a sport.

Academics

School colors are also used in the academic dress of many institutions. The first school color adopted by a university for its academic dress was palatinate purple at Durham University, England, some time between 1835 and 1838. Schools in the US that award an academic hood to their students and abide by the American Council on Education guidelines use hoods lined with their school colors and trimmed with velvet in a color indicating the discipline of the degree. Some US doctoral robes will also be in the colors of the university which granted the degree, departing from the Academic Costume Code color of black.

Academic scarves

Many British, Irish and Commonwealth universities and some American universities have an academic scarf in the university's colors, usually long, woollen and patterned only with lengthwise stripes of varying widths. At collegiate universities such as Oxford, Cambridge, Durham and Lancaster, each college has its own colors and scarf. Other non-collegiate universities such as Glasgow and Newcastle have scarf colors for each faculty.

Notable school colors

 Cambridge blue – University of Cambridge
 Carolina blue – University of North Carolina
 Columbia blue – Columbia University
 Duke blue – Duke University
 Eton blue – Eton School
 Oxford blue – University of Oxford
 Palatinate – Durham University
 RISD blue – Rhode Island School of Design
 Tufts blue – Tufts University 
 UCLA blue – University of California Los Angeles
 Yale blue – Yale University

See also
Gang colors
Colors (motorcycling)
Sports uniform
Varsity letter
Couleur

References

External links

 
Colors, school